James Nesbitt's Ireland is a British travel documentary show that aired on ITV from 18 March to 6 May 2013 and was presented by James Nesbitt.

References

2010s British documentary television series
2013 British television series debuts
2013 British television series endings
ITV documentaries
2010s British television miniseries
Television series by ITV Studios
English-language television shows
Television shows set in the Republic of Ireland